IBSF may refer to:

International Billiards and Snooker Federation
International Bobsleigh and Skeleton Federation